The New Zealand DSJ class is a class of diesel-electric shunting locomotive used on the New Zealand rail network. The class has a very similar overall design to the DSG class, but is instead single-engined, has a cab that is offset from the centre and is both shorter and lighter than its twin-engined counterpart.

Introduction 

The first DSJ was assembled in Japan by Toshiba Heavy Industries in 1983 and arrived in New Zealand in 1984. Toshiba are the same company who built the EO class electric locomotives. The remaining four were assembled at the former Addington Workshops in Christchurch, and entered service from 1984 to 1985.

With only five members in this class, it represents one of the smallest contingents of shunt locomotives in current use.

In service 
The locomotives have spent most of their time in use at the Te Rapa Marshalling Yard and Picton, and have ventured elsewhere on the network from time to time, including Ahuriri in Napier.

Accidents 

On the afternoon of 1 September 2021, DSJ4004 and a wagon went off the end of the rail ferry linkspan at Picton and into the harbour. The wagon and locomotive were retrieved from the harbour on 2 and 3 September 2021 respectively. No one was injured during the incident. Due to the cost of repairing the flooded locomotive, DSJ4004 was written off and became a parts donor for the remainder of the fleet.

References

Further reading 

 

Diesel-electric locomotives of New Zealand
3 ft 6 in gauge locomotives of New Zealand
Railway locomotives introduced in 1984